The 2021–22 Armenian Premier League, known as the VBET Armenian Premier League for sponsorship reasons, was the 30th season of the league since its establishment.

Season events
On 9 July 2021, the Football Federation of Armenia announced that 10 teams would play in the 2021–22 season of the Armenian Premier League. BKMA Yerevan, Noravank and Sevan where all promoted to the Premier League and given licenses, replacing Gandzasar Kapan and Lori who'd previously withdrawn from the league the previous season, and Shirak who were relegated.

On 1 December, the Football Federation of Armenia Disciplinary Committee voted in favor to remove Sevan from the Armenian Premier League after they failed to turn up for two games in a row, against Alashkert and BKMA Yerevan. As a result, all of Sevan's results were excluded from the championship table.

Teams

 1Noah played their home games for the first half of the season at the Yerevan Football Academy Stadium, Yerevan, instead of their home venue Mika Stadium, Yerevan.  For the second half of the season they played their home games at the Armavir City Stadium in Armavir.
 2Noravank play their home games at the Charentsavan City Stadium, Charentsavan until the second half of the season, due to the rebuilding of their regular venue Arevik Stadium, Vayk.
 3Sevan play their home games at Alashkert Stadium, Yerevan, instead of their home venue Sevan City Stadium, Sevan.

Personnel and sponsorship

Managerial changes

League table

Fixtures and results

Round 1–16

Round 17–32

Season statistics

Top scorers

Hat-tricks

Clean sheets

Awards

Annual awards

References

External links
 

Armenian Premier League seasons
Arm
1